Sono stato io (internationally released as It Was I) is a 1973 Italian comedy-drama film directed by Alberto Lattuada. For his role Giancarlo Giannini was awarded as best actor at the San Sebastián International Film Festival.

Cast 
Giancarlo Giannini: Biagio Solise
Silvia Monti: Jacqueline
Hiram Keller: Il Kid
Orazio Orlando: Il Commissario
Patricia Chiti: Gloria Strozzi
Georges Wilson: Il pubblico ministero
Giuseppe Maffioli: L'avvocato Difensore
Piero Chiara: Il Presidente Della Corte
Nino Pavese: Il Cavalier Armando Toluzzi
Ely Galleani: L'autostoppista

References

External links

1973 films
Films directed by Alberto Lattuada
1973 comedy-drama films
Italian comedy-drama films
Commedia all'italiana
Films about miscarriage of justice
1973 comedy films
1973 drama films
1970s Italian-language films
1970s Italian films